The 1830 New Hampshire gubernatorial election was held on March 9, 1830.

Incumbent Democratic Governor Benjamin Pierce did not stand for re-election.

Democratic nominee Matthew Harvey defeated National Republican nominee Timothy Upham with 54.70% of the vote.

General election

Candidates
Matthew Harvey, Democratic, former President of the New Hampshire Senate
Timothy Upham, National Republican, member of the New Hampshire House of Representatives, former Collector of Customs at Portsmouth

Results

References

Notes

1830
New Hampshire
Gubernatorial